Heteroteuthis dagamensis is a species of bobtail squid native to the southeastern Atlantic Ocean and southwestern Indian Ocean. It occurs off western, southern, and southeastern Africa.

The type specimen was collected off South Africa and is deposited at The Natural History Museum in London.

References

External links 

Bobtail squid
Molluscs described in 1924